Hurricane Juliette was a long-lasting Category 4 hurricane in the 2001 Pacific hurricane season. It caused 12 deaths and $400 million (2001 USD; $  USD) in damage when it hit Baja California in late September. Juliette developed from a tropical wave that had previously produced a tropical depression. The wave moved from the Atlantic to the Eastern Pacific, where it started to intensify. Soon, it became a tropical storm and was named Juliette. It then became a hurricane two days later, after struggling to do so. Rapidly intensifying due to favourable conditions, Juliette reached Category 4 status. However, an eyewall replacement cycle caused Juliette to significantly weaken down to a Category 2 hurricane. It eventually completed the cycle, and Juliette was able to reintensify to its peak intensity of 145 mph and 923 milibars. Another eyewall replacement cycle ensued however, resulting in Juliette having 3 eyewalls at once, which is an extremely rare occurrence. Eventually, Juliette weakened to a tropical storm, but Juliette's circulation was still well-defined. Warm waters allowed it to re-intensify to a hurricane, but this was short-lived as Juliette meandered near Baja California and its center became difficult to locate. It made landfall on Baja California as a tropical storm. Its circulation reached the Gulf of California, where it restrengthened slightly. Juliette made landfall on Baja California and dissipated on October 3.

Meteorological history

The tropical wave that later produced Juliette first produced Tropical Depression Nine in the Atlantic Ocean. Forming in the Caribbean Sea, the depression dissipated over Central America on September 20, a day after formation. By early on September 21, the remnants of Nine had re-organized in Pacific, and was then upgraded into a tropical depression. Six hours later, the depression was upgraded into a tropical storm. However, the storm was not named Juliette until later that day, when the storm was operationally believed to have formed (which came after reports from a Hurricane Hunter aircraft).

In an environment of light wind shear, meteorologists predicted the new system to reach hurricane intensity within two days. While a major decrease in thunderstorm activity initially inhibited intensification it became better organized on September 22. By the afternoon of September 23, Juliette had become a hurricane, with maximum sustained winds reaching 75 mph (120 km/h).

Upon becoming a hurricane, infrared imagery suggested that the hurricane had developed a pinhole eye. Forecasters were also expecting Juliette to reach major hurricane status, Category 3 or higher on the Saffir-Simpson Hurricane Scale. Steadily moving west, the storm underwent rapid deepening. By 1800 UTC September 23, Juliette had reached Category 2 status, with winds of 100 mph (145 km/h). Shortly thereafter, the hurricane intensified directly into a Category 4 storm, bypassing the Category 3 stage, an unusual occurrence for a tropical cyclone. In all, Juliette had intensified 60 mph (130 km/h) in 18 hours.

After reaching its initial peak as a low-end Category 4 hurricane, microwave and Hurricane Hunter data indicated that Juliette underwent an eyewall replacement cycle. Subsequently, Juliette weakened into a Category 3 hurricane on September 24 and then into a high-end Category 2 system with 110 mph (160 km/h) winds; however, by September 25, Juliette had completed the cycle and quickly regained major hurricane status. The hurricane developed very cold cloud top temperatures. along with a classic structure of an intense hurricane and a very well-defined eye. Around that time, Reconnaissance Aircraft reported a minimum central pressure of 923 mbar.

Shortly after its peak, a strong trough of low pressure brought Hurricane Juliette northward where the cyclone moved over cooler water temperatures. While Juliette initially maintained well-defined banding features and an impressive upper-level outflow, another eyewall replacement cycle took its toll on the storm; this time three centric eyewalls formed compared to the normal two, a very rare occurrence. Moving much farther east than anticipated, an eye was no longer visible on satellite imagery by September 27.

Juliette slowed its forward motion as it continued north-northwestward and weakened to a tropical storm on September 28. Even though thunderstorm activity decreased markedly, Tropical Storm Juliette maintained a well-defined atmospheric circulation and a large area of gale-force winds. A small area of warm waters near the Baja California Peninsula allowed the storm to re-strengthen into a hurricane early on September 29 as convection increased. At this time, computer models suggested two distinct possibilities of the storm's path. Some suggested Hurricane Juliette might move inland while others expected the hurricane to parallel the peninsula.

Meandering offshore, the center soon became difficult to locate. The low-level circulation became exposed from the deep convection as increased vertical shear again took its toll on Juliette, and the storm hit Baja California near Cabo San Lucas as a minimal  tropical storm at 0000 UTC September 30. Although scientists noted the possibility of slight re-intensification over the Gulf of California, Juliette's low level circulation remained as it crossed the peninsula, and it restrengthened in the northern Gulf of California as the circulation became better defined. Lacking deep convection, it drifted westward, where, after making a landfall in northeastern Baja California, it finally dissipated early on October 3.

Preparations

Not long after Juliette was designated as a tropical storm on September 21, the Government of Mexico issued a tropical storm warning for areas between Salina Cruz and Acapulco and a tropical storm watch for areas west of Acapulco to Lázaro Cárdenas, Michoacán. Later that day, the warning was updated to include areas through Zihuatanejo and a watch through Manzanillo, Colima. Once Juliette turned westward and no longer posed a threat to the country, all watches and warnings were discontinued by the afternoon of September 22. However, due to the system's slow, erratic track on September 23, a hurricane watch and tropical storm warning was issued for areas between Lázaro Cárdenas and Cabo Corrientes. These advisories remained in place through the afternoon of September 25, by which time Juliette had picked up forward momentum and tracked northwestward. By September 26, the hurricane threatened land once more, prompting watches and warnings for the Baja California Peninsula. Initially, only a tropical storm watch was issued for the southern tip of Baja California Sur but, as the storm neared the peninsula, more extensive advisories were declared. By the morning of September 27, a hurricane warning covered much of both coasts of Baja California Sur as the storm was forecast to track directly through the state. The following day, a tropical storm warning was issued for areas between Mazatlán and Yavaros in Sonora but, this was discontinued later that day. As the storm stalled offshore and weakened, all hurricane warnings were replaced with tropical storm warnings which were later canceled once Juliette weakened to a tropical depression. Forecasters also noted the possibility of moisture spreading into the Southwestern portion of the United States.

Impact

Southern Mexico
Along coastal areas around Acapulco, the storm brought heavy rainfall and strong winds. Offshore, one fisherman was killed by the storm after he set sail directly into it. In Guerrero, heavy rains triggered flash floods that washed out two bridges and destroyed 20 homes. As rains continued to fall over the following days, mountainsides gave way, producing landslides which killed seven people. Strong winds also uprooted trees and downed power lines in several states. Additionally, two fishermen were listed as missing after venturing out into  swells produced by Juliette. Throughout Michoacán, an estimated 1,000 people were left homeless by the hurricane.

Baja California Peninsula

As Hurricane Juliette stalled just off the coast of Baja California Sur, it produced prolonged heavy rainfall in the region. A maximum of  fell in Caudaño, the highest known total ever recorded from a tropical cyclone in the state.

The extreme rainfall led to widespread flooding and mudslides across the state. Along the southern tip of the peninsula, roughly 3,000 people were stranded after their town was isolated by flood waters. About 800 more people had to be evacuated due to the state of their homes. Damage from the floods were widespread in the area, with more than 9,000 people reported damage to their property from the storm. At least two people were killed across the peninsula in storm-related incidents. Damage from Hurricane Juliette was estimated at $400 million (2001 USD; $  USD).

Southwestern United States
Late in Juliette's life and in its aftermath, the remnants brought strong thunderstorm activity to the American Southwest, knocking down trees and power lines in southern California. Rainfall in the United States peaked at 0.9 inches in Patagonia, Arizona.

Aftermath and records
Following the significant damage across southern states, Mexican authorities and the army deployed transport and rescue aircraft along with medical teams and emergency supplies. As reports of damage began to come out of Baja California Sur, the state governor declared the entire area a disaster zone.

At its peak, Juliette attained a minimum pressure of 923 mbar (hPa; 27.26 inHg), ranking it as the fifth-strongest Pacific hurricane on record, along with Olivia in 1994. However, in subsequent years, five other storms have surpassed it and the storm now ranks as the tenth-strongest in the basin. At the time, it held the record for having the lowest barometric pressure of any Category 4 hurricane in the region, a record shared with Olivia; it has since been surpassed by Odile in 2014 with a minimum pressure of 918 mbar (hPa; 27.23 inHg) .

See also

 Other storms named Juliette
 List of tropical cyclones
 List of Category 4 Pacific hurricanes
 List of Baja California Peninsula hurricanes

References

External links

 NHC Report
 Juliette Best Track
 Juliette effects in Cabo San Lucas
 HPC rainfall report for Juliette
 Boating Effects
 Early Effects
 Michoacán Effects
After Effects

Juliette
2001 in Mexico
Juliette (2001)
Juliette (2001)
Juliette (2001)
Juliette (2001)
2001 natural disasters in the United States
Juliette
Juliette (2001)
Juliette (2001)
September 2001 events in Oceania
October 2001 events in Oceania
Juliette